Smolino is a rural locality (a selo) in Ivanovskoye Rural Settlement, Kovrovsky District, Vladimir Oblast, Russia. The population was 377 as of 2010. There are 5 streets.

Geography 
Smolino is located 40 km south of Kovrov (the district's administrative centre) by road. Krasny Oktyabr is the nearest rural locality.

References 

Rural localities in Kovrovsky District
Sudogodsky Uyezd